The AEC Matador was a heavy 4×4 truck and medium artillery tractor built by the Associated Equipment Company for British and Commonwealth forces during World War II. AEC had already built a 4×2 lorry, also known as the Matador (all AEC lorries received 'M' names).

Description
The Matador was distinctive with its flat fronted cab with gently curved roof, wheels at the corners and a flat load carrying area covered by a canvas or tarpaulin tilt. As an artillery tractor, rather than a cargo vehicle, the wooden sides were fixed in place without folding down, but did have a narrow crew door on each side. Two transverse bench seats were provided for the gun crew, accessed through the side doors, at the 1st side bay on the left and the 2nd on the right.

The cab was framed in ash and clad in steel. It was equipped with a winch (7-ton load in its case) like all artillery tractors. The O853 provided the basis for the 'Dorchester' armoured command vehicle.

AEC also produced a larger 6×6 vehicle, model O854, based on components from both the AEC Marshal 6x4 and the 4×4 Matador.  These were produced in both petrol and diesel and were also referred to as Matadors. The O854 provided the basis for the O857.

A small number of Petrol engined 4x4 Matadors were also built.  These were given the model number 853.

Service

About 9,000 Matadors were built, some going to the Royal Air Force (RAF).

For the British Army, it fulfilled a role between field artillery tractors (FATs) such as the Morris C8 Quad, which towed smaller guns such as the 25-pounder gun-howitzer, and the Scammell Pioneer, used for towing the 7.2-inch howitzer. It was commonly used to tow the 5.5-inch medium gun and the QF 3.7-inch AA gun. The Matador was found to be a generally useful vehicle and was adapted for other roles, including carrying a 25-pounder gun.

The RAF used Matadors in the flat bed form for load carrying. The 6-wheeler Matador Type A with refuelling pumps and equipment by Zwicky Ltd, was used as a refuelling tanker, capable of carrying 2,500 Imperial gallons of fuel and also for towing ashore Short Sunderland flying boats at their stations.

Six armoured flamethrowers, the 'Heavy Cockatrice' on the 6×6 chassis, were used by the RAF for airfield defence.

In 1942/43, for the North African campaign, some Matadors mounted the 6-pounder anti-tank gun to give the AEC Mk1 Gun Carrier "Deacon".

The Canadian Army used the Matador during World War II.

Post-war 

Post-war, the Matador was found in civilian use as a recovery truck, a showman's vehicle, and general contractor use. It was also useful for forestry work because of its good off-road performance. When used as a bus fleet recovery truck, many were fitted with lifting jibs for suspended towing and re-bodied with semi-enclosed bodies, often based on bodywork from scrapped buses.

See also
Bedford QLD - 3 ton general service truck four wheel drive, 4WD, introduced 1941.
Austin K2/Y
Canadian Military Pattern Field Artillery Tractor

References

 Steve Richards, AEC Matador: Taking The Rough With The Smooth, Japonica Press, 2009, .

External links

AEC Militant and Matador owners
The AEC Society was founded in 1983 for the preservation and documentation of the products of AEC Ltd.
AEC Matador (1938), Truck Encyclopedia, Military Trucks & Cars Section

Military trucks of the United Kingdom
Artillery tractors
Off-road vehicles
World War II vehicles of the United Kingdom
Matador
Soft-skinned vehicles
Military vehicles introduced in the 1930s